Djibril Diani (born 11 February 1998) is a French professional footballer who plays as a midfielder for Ligue 2 club Caen.

Club career
On 2 February 2021, it was confirmed that Diani had joined Scottish Premiership side Livingston on a six-month loan deal with an option to make the deal permanent. He returned to Grasshopper Club Zürich for the following season. On 4 January 2022, Diani signed for Ligue 2 club Caen on a contract until 2024.

International career
Diani was born in France and is of Malian descent. He is a youth international for France.

References

External links
 
 
 FFF Profile

1998 births
Living people
Sportspeople from Créteil
Association football midfielders
French footballers
France youth international footballers
French people of Malian descent
French expatriate footballers
AS Choisy-le-Roi players
Grasshopper Club Zürich players
Livingston F.C. players
Stade Malherbe Caen players
Swiss Super League players
Championnat National 2 players
Swiss 1. Liga (football) players
Swiss Challenge League players
Scottish Professional Football League players
Expatriate footballers in Switzerland
French expatriate sportspeople in Scotland
French expatriate sportspeople in Switzerland
Expatriate footballers in Scotland
Footballers from Val-de-Marne